Mosopia is a genus of moths of the family Erebidae. It is found in south-east Asia, including Thailand, Borneo and Malaysia. The genus was first described by Francis Walker in 1866 from a specimen in the British Museum. The specimen Walker describes was from Penang in Malaysia.

Walker gave Mosopia megaspila as a type species. Three other species are also classified in the genus Mosopia.

Species
In alphabetical order:
Mosopia eudoxusalis (Walker, [1859]) Sundaland, Thailand
Mosopia kononenkoi Holloway, 2008 Borneo, Sumatra, Peninsular Malaysia, Thailand
Mosopia magniplaga (Swinhoe, 1905) Meghalaya
Mosopia megaspila Walker, [1866] Peninsular Malaysia, Borneo
Mosopia pallidusalis Holloway, 2008 Borneo
Mosopia sordidum (Butler, 1879) Japan, Korea

References

Herminiinae